The Enoch Williams House is a historic house located in Taunton, Massachusetts.

Description and history 
Built in 1850, the -story, Greek Revival style farm house is set on a side hall plan, with a front gable with a recessed wing and attached barn. The entrance features side lights with a pilaster and entablature surround. The house was built by Enoch Williams, member of a prominent East Taunton family, and is located on what is one of East Taunton's largest surviving farm properties.

It was added to the National Register of Historic Places on July 5, 1984.

See also
National Register of Historic Places listings in Taunton, Massachusetts

References

National Register of Historic Places in Taunton, Massachusetts
Houses in Taunton, Massachusetts
Houses on the National Register of Historic Places in Bristol County, Massachusetts
Houses completed in 1850
Greek Revival houses in Massachusetts